1990 Dakar Rally also known as the 1990 Paris–Dakar Rally was the 12th running of the Dakar Rally event. 465 competitors started from La Défense. The rally was won by 1981 world rally champion, Ari Vatanen, for the third time in four years. The motorcycle class was won by Edi Orioli.

References

Dakar Rally
Paris
Paris
1990 in African sport